Dániel Köntös (born 15 June 1984, in Székesfehérvár) is a Hungarian football (defender) player who currently plays for Csákvári TK.

References
HLSZ 

1984 births
Living people
Sportspeople from Székesfehérvár
Hungarian footballers
Association football defenders
FC Felcsút players
BFC Siófok players
FC Tatabánya players
Dunaújváros PASE players